Cyril Leverton Vincent (16 February 1902 – 24 August 1968) was a South African cricketer who played in 25 Test matches from 1927 to 1935. He was later chairman of the South African selectors.

References

External links

 

1902 births
1968 deaths
Gauteng cricketers
South Africa Test cricketers
South African cricketers